Faouzi Mubarak Aaish (born 27 February 1985) is a Bahraini professional football player of Moroccan origin. He is currently a free agent and the Bahrain national football team.

International career
Born in Morocco, Aaish represented Bahrain in international competition and made 103 appearances for the Bahrain national football team, including 14 qualifying matches for the 2006 and 2010 FIFA World Cup. He scored the game-winning goal against Qatar to keep Bahrain's hopes of qualifying alive on 2 April 2009. Faouzi scored a penalty against Qatar which ended to 1–0 win, and Bahrain made it out of the group stage into the semi-finals of the GCC cup.

International goals
Scores and Results list Bahrain's goal tally first

|-
| 1. || 14 June 2008 || Bahrain National Stadium, Riffa, Bahrain ||  ||  ||  || 2010 FIFA World Cup qualification
|-
| 2. || 4 February 2009 || Maktoum Bin Rashid Al Maktoum Stadium, Dubai, United Arab Emirates ||  ||  ||  || Friendly
|-
| 3. || 23 March 2009 || Bahrain National Stadium, Riffa, Bahrain ||  ||  ||  || Friendly
|-
| 4. || 1 April 2009 || Bahrain National Stadium, Riffa, Bahrain ||  ||  ||  || 2010 FIFA World Cup qualification
|-
| 5. || 8 October 2010 || Jaber Al-Ahmad International Stadium, Kuwait City, Kuwait ||  ||  ||  || Friendly
|-
| 6. || 12 October 2010 || Bahrain National Stadium, Riffa, Bahrain ||  ||  ||  || Friendly
|-
| 7. || 26 November 2010 || May 22 Stadium, Aden, Yemen ||  ||  ||  || 2010 Gulf Cup of Nations
|-
| 8. || 28 December 2010 || Maktoum Bin Rashid Al Maktoum Stadium, Dubai, United Arab Emirates ||  ||  ||  || Friendly
|-
| 9. || 10 January 2011 || Thani bin Jassim Stadium, Doha, Qatar ||  ||  ||  || 2011 AFC Asian Cup
|-
| 10. || 14 January 2011 || Jassim Bin Hamad Stadium, Doha, Qatar ||  ||  ||  || 2011 AFC Asian Cup
|-
| 11. || 8 November 2012 || Bahrain National Stadium, Riffa, Bahrain ||  ||  ||  || Friendly
|-
| 12. || 11 January 2013 || Bahrain National Stadium, Riffa, Bahrain ||  ||  ||  || 2013 Gulf Cup of Nations
|-
| 13. || 6 February 2013 || Sharjah Stadium, Sharjah, United Arab Emirates ||  ||  ||  || 2015 AFC Asian Cup qualification
|-
| 14. || 22 March 2013 || Bahrain National Stadium, Riffa, Bahrain ||  ||  ||  || 2015 AFC Asian Cup qualification
|-
| 15. || 19 November 2013 || Bahrain National Stadium, Riffa, Bahrain ||  ||  ||  || 2015 AFC Asian Cup qualification
|-
| 16. || 9 September 2014 || Ali Sabah Al-Salem Stadium, Al Farwaniyah, Kuwait ||  ||  ||  || Friendly
|-
| 17. || 30 December 2014 || Melbourne Cricket Ground, Melbourne, Australia ||  ||  ||  || Friendly
|-
| 18. || 4 January 2015 || Morshead Park Stadium, Ballarat, Australia ||  ||  ||  || Friendly
|-
| 19. || 30 March 2015 || Bahrain National Stadium, Riffa, Bahrain ||  ||  ||  || Friendly
|}

See also
 List of men's footballers with 100 or more international caps

References

External links

1985 births
Living people
Bahraini footballers
Footballers from Casablanca
Al-Sailiya SC players
Dubai CSC players
Umm Salal SC players
UAE Pro League players
2007 AFC Asian Cup players
2011 AFC Asian Cup players
2015 AFC Asian Cup players
Bahraini expatriate footballers
Expatriate footballers in Qatar
Expatriate footballers in the United Arab Emirates
Association football midfielders
Footballers at the 2006 Asian Games
FIFA Century Club
Qatar Stars League players
Bahraini people of Moroccan descent
Asian Games competitors for Bahrain
Bahrain international footballers